The 2009 European Sevens Championship was a rugby sevens competition, with the final held in Hanover, Germany. It was the eighth edition of the European Sevens championship and was organised by rugby's European governing body, the FIRA – Association of European Rugby (FIRA-AER).

The tournament differed from the previous seasons event as the number of participating men's teams had been reduced from twelve to ten. Instead, a women's tournament was held alongside the men's, also consisting of ten teams. The men's tournament was won by Russia, while England took out the women's title.

Tournament history
From 2002, FIRA, the governing body of European rugby, has been organising an annual European Sevens Championship tournament. A number of qualifying tournaments lead up to a finals tournament, which functions as the European championship and, in 2008, also as the qualifying stage for the Sevens World Cup.

The first European Championship was held in 2002 in Heidelberg, Germany, and was won by Portugal, the team that won every men's championship since except 2007 and 2009, when Russia won. In 2003,  the tournament was again held in Heidelberg and, in 2004, Palma de Mallorca, Spain was the host. From 2005 to 2007, Moscow was the host of the tournament.

Hanover held the tournament for the first time in 2008 and did so again in 2009. In 2010, the tournament will return to Moscow.

Finals stadium

The 2008 and 2009 finals tournaments were held at the AWD-Arena in Hanover, home ground of the football club Hannover 96. The stadium holds 50.000 spectators, 43,000 of them on seats, the rest standing.

Qualifying
A qualifying competition was held for the men's teams, with points allocated according to final placings in each tournament. Each nation was required to play two qualifying tournaments.

Ten teams qualified through the six qualifying tournaments, held at the following locations:

Final standings
These are the final standings of the tournament:

References

External links
 Hannover sevens website 
 FIRA-AER official website

2009
International rugby union competitions hosted by Germany
European
2009–10 in European rugby union
2009–10 in German rugby union
Rugby union in Hanover